The following lists events that happened during 2005 in Kuwait.

Incumbents
Emir: Jaber Al-Ahmad Al-Jaber Al-Sabah
Prime Minister: Sabah Al-Ahmad Al-Jaber Al-Sabah

Events

January
 January 30 - A firefight leaves 3 suspected militants and one Kuwaiti police officer dead after security forces raid an alleged hideout in Kuwait City.

Establishments

 HSBC Bank Middle East.

References

 
Kuwait
Kuwait
Years of the 21st century in Kuwait
2000s in Kuwait